Anzhelika Albertovna Isaeva (born 20 November 2000) is a Russian tennis player.

Isaeva has a career-high singles ranking of 374 by the WTA, achieved on 25 April 2022. She has won one singles title and one doubles title on the ITF Women's World Tennis Tour.

Isaeva won her biggest title at the 2022 Nur-Sultan International Tournament, where she defeated top 100-player Greet Minnen in the final by retirement.

ITF finals

Singles: 3 (1 title, 2 runner-ups)

Doubles: 1 (1 title)

References

External links
 
 

2000 births
Living people
Russian female tennis players
21st-century Russian women